Pukeashun Provincial Park is a provincial park in British Columbia, Canada, located north of the community of Scotch Creek, near the city of Salmon Arm.  The park is named for Pukeashun Mountain which is within its boundaries and a major local landmark.  It protects part of the Adams Plateau, the southeastern portion of the Shuswap Highland.

References

Parks in the Shuswap Country
Provincial parks of British Columbia
1966 establishments in British Columbia
Protected areas established in 1966